The 2003–04 Connecticut Huskies women's basketball team represented the University of Connecticut in the 2003–2004 NCAA Division I basketball season. Coached by Geno Auriemma, the Huskies played their home games at the Hartford Civic Center in Hartford, Connecticut, and on campus at the Harry A. Gampel Pavilion in Storrs, Connecticut, and are a member of the Big East Conference.  The Huskies won their fifth NCAA championship, and third consecutive, by defeating the Tennessee Lady Vols, 70–61.

Roster
Source

Schedule

|-
!colspan=8| Regular season

|-
!colspan=9| 2004 Big East Women's Basketball Tournament

|-
!colspan=10| 2004 NCAA Division I women's basketball tournament

Awards and honors
 Diana Taurasi, Big East Conference Women's Basketball Player of the Year
 Diana Taurasi, Tournament Most Outstanding Player
 Diana Taurasi, Naismith Award

Huskies of Honor induction
On December 29, 2013, the University of Connecticut inducted two women's basketball team, the National Championship winning teams of 2002–03 and 2003–04 into the Huskies of Honor.

Team players drafted into the WNBA

See also
 Connecticut Huskies women's basketball
 UConn–Rutgers rivalry
 UConn–Tennessee rivalry
 2004 NCAA Division I women's basketball tournament

References

Connecticut
UConn Huskies women's basketball seasons
NCAA Division I women's basketball tournament championship seasons
NCAA Division I women's basketball tournament Final Four seasons
Connect
Connect
2004 NCAA Division I women's basketball tournament participants